Three for Love is the fourth album by American R&B group Shalamar, released in 1980 on the SOLAR label.  It was produced by Leon Sylvers III and features the 'classic' Shalamar line-up (Jeffrey Daniel, Howard Hewett and Jody Watley). 

Three for Love has been certified Gold in the United States for sales of over 500,000.  The album eventually went Platinum. It peaked at #8 on the R&B chart and #40 on the Billboard chart.

In 2002, Three for Love was re-released by Sanctuary Records in the United Kingdom in a two-for-one CD format with Shalamar's previous album Big Fun.

Reception
Allmusic rated the album four and a half out of five stars. Music critic Robert Christgau graded it "A−". Writer Colin Larkin rated it three out of five.

The album sold over 875,000+ as of July 1982. Its single "Make That Move" sold 535,000+ units.

The album was ranked 43 on The 80 Greatest Albums of 1980 by Rolling Stone magazine.

Track listing

Personnel

Shalamar
Jeffrey Daniel - lead & backing vocals
Howard Hewett - lead & backing vocals
Jody Watley - lead & backing vocals

Musical Personnel
Leon Sylvers III - bass, percussion
Foster Sylvers - bass
Wardell Potts, Jr. - drums
Stephen Shockley - guitar
Richard Randolph - guitar
Ernest "Pepper" Reed - guitar
Ricky Sylvers - guitar
Fred Alexander, Jr. - percussion
Kevin Spencer - keyboards
Joey Gallo - keyboards
James Sylvers - keyboards
Michael Nash - keyboards
Ricky Smith - keyboards

Charts

Weekly charts

Year-end charts

Single

References

External links

Shalamar albums
1980 albums
SOLAR Records albums
Albums produced by Leon Sylvers III